Donald Parsons may refer to:

 Donald F. Parsons, American former judge
 Donald J. Parsons (1922–2016), American Episcopal bishop
 Donald Parsons (businessman) (1930–2012), American businessman
 Don Parsons (politician), member of the House of Representatives in the U.S. state of Georgia
 Don Parsons (ice hockey) (born 1969), retired professional ice hockey player